In number theory, a compatible system of ℓ-adic representations is an abstraction of certain important families of ℓ-adic Galois representations, indexed by prime numbers ℓ, that have compatibility properties for almost all ℓ.

Examples
Prototypical examples include the cyclotomic character and the Tate module of an abelian variety.

Variations
A slightly more restrictive notion is that of a strictly compatible system of ℓ-adic representations which offers more control on the compatibility properties. More recently, some authors have started requiring more compatibility related to p-adic Hodge theory.

Importance
Compatible systems of ℓ-adic representations are a fundamental concept in contemporary algebraic number theory.

Notes

References

Algebraic number theory